Rising Sun is a hamlet near Calstock in Cornwall, England.

References

External links

 The Rising Sun Inn, Gunnislake

Hamlets in Cornwall